Robert Kane Pappas is an American filmmaker who has written and directed feature films including Now I Know (Lifetime Television) and Some Fish Can Fly.

Pappas has also written and directed To Age or Not to Age, The Computer Moment (featuring William H. Macy) and received a Parents Choice Award for his children's videos. Pappas also wrote, directed, filmed and edited the mass media-critiquing Orwell Rolls in His Grave a documentary about media.

Pappas was born in New York City and has worked at Georgetown University and New York University's Tisch School of the Arts.

References

Living people
Year of birth missing (living people)
American film directors
Georgetown University alumni
Tisch School of the Arts alumni